Joe Wizan (January 7, 1935 – March 21, 2011) was an American film producer and studio executive. He was head of 20th Century Fox's motion picture division from 1983 to 1984. His credits as a producer or executive producer include Jeremiah Johnson, Junior Bonner, The Last American Hero, Audrey Rose, Along Came a Spider and Dark Night of the Scarecrow. Wizan died on March 21, 2011, at an assisted-living facility in Westlake Village, California. He was 76.

In 1987, Joe Wizan Productions decided to invest in a $5 million Canadian investment firm for the total financing of his company's projects over the U.S., and merged his company Sterobcar Productions, with a Canadian investment firm Black Pearl Resources, in order to start out a new company Wizan Film Properties, and that Brian Findlay would be a principal of the firm, which lined up Canadian principals in the new fund, and instead of going hat-in-hand to studios, Wizan is planning on to develop screenplays in close collaborations with writers, and to flesh out packages with stars and majors before shopping the properties to the majors.

Filmography
He was a producer in all films unless otherwise noted.

Film

Miscellaneous crew

Thanks

Television

As an actor

References

External links 

1935 births
2011 deaths
American film studio executives
Film producers from California
People from Malibu, California
Place of birth missing
People from Westlake Village, California